Walter G. Spohn (June 5, 1914 - January 24, 2003) was the founder of the American Anaplastology Association, and coined the phrase anaplastology. In 2008, the American Anaplastology Association became the International Anaplastology Association.

External links
 International Anaplastology Association

1914 births
2003 deaths
American plastic surgeons
20th-century surgeons